Wardell Stephen Curry Sr. (born June 25, 1964) is an American former professional basketball player. He played in the National Basketball Association (NBA) from 1986 until 2002 and retired as the Charlotte Hornets' all-time leader in points (9,839) and three-point field goals made (929). Curry currently works as a color commentator, alongside Eric Collins, on Charlotte Hornets television broadcasts. He is the father of NBA players Stephen Curry and Seth Curry.

Early years
Born in Harrisonburg, Virginia, Curry was raised in Grottoes and played high school basketball at Fort Defiance, where he used his coach's barn to practice shooting daily. He finished as the all-time leading scorer in school history, and was named a McDonald's All-American in 1982. Curry also played baseball, and won state championships in both sports; he was selected by the Texas Rangers in the 1982 Major League Baseball draft.

College career
Curry was a four-year starter at Virginia Tech in Blacksburg along with contemporaries Bobby Beecher, Perry Young, Al Young, and Keith Colbert. The Hokies appeared in the National Invitation Tournament (NIT) in 1983 and 1984, finishing third in the latter. Although the team qualified for at-large bids to the NCAA tournament in 1985 and 1986, it lost in the first round on both occasions. In his senior season in 1986, Curry was named the player of the year in the Metro Conference. Prior to the 1986–87 season, NCAA basketball did not feature a three-point line; Curry's accurate long-range shooting was not rewarded, as it would be later in his NBA career. (In the early and mid 1980s, the three-point line was introduced in many conferences at varying distances, but it was not recognized by the NCAA.)

Curry also played baseball for Virginia Tech. He was selected by the Baltimore Orioles in the 14th round of the 1985 MLB draft but opted to continue playing basketball.

Curry finished his Virginia Tech career with 2,389 points (second all-time) and 295 steals (all-time leader) in basketball, and a 6–1 record with a 3.81 ERA in baseball.

He was inducted into the Virginia Tech Sports Hall of Fame in 1996, his first year of eligibility.

NBA career
Curry was selected with the 15th overall pick by the Utah Jazz in the 1986 NBA draft. He played one season in Utah before being traded to the Cleveland Cavaliers in 1987, where he spent the 1987–88 season. He was left unprotected by Cleveland for the 1988 NBA expansion draft and was the second player selected, the first by the Charlotte Hornets.  Curry spent 10 seasons in Charlotte, mostly coming off the bench to provide instant offense with three-point shooting. He was a regular in the discussions for Sixth Man of the Year and won the honor in the 1993–94 season. He was once the franchise's all-time statistical leader in points, games played, three-point field goals made and attempted, and three-point field goal percentage. When he left the team in 1998, he was the last player remaining from its inaugural season 10 years earlier.

Curry played one season for the Milwaukee Bucks before playing his final three seasons in the NBA for the Toronto Raptors. He holds career averages of 11.7 points, 2.4 rebounds, and 1.8 assists. Curry retired as the all-time leading scorer in Hornets history with 9,839 points.

NBA career statistics

Regular season

|-
|style="text-align:left;"|
|style="text-align:left;"|Utah
| 67 || 0 || 9.5 || .426 || .283 || .789 || 1.2 || .9 || .4 || .1 || 4.9
|-
|style="text-align:left;"|
|style="text-align:left;"|Cleveland
| 79 || 8 || 19.0 || .458 || .346 || .782 || 2.1 || 1.9 || 1.2 || .3 || 10.0
|-
|style="text-align:left;"|
|style="text-align:left;"|Charlotte
| 48 || 0 || 16.9 || .491 || .345 || .870 || 2.2 || 1.0 || .9 || .1 || 11.9
|-
|style="text-align:left;"|
|style="text-align:left;"|Charlotte
| 67 || 13 || 27.8 || .466 || .354 || .923 || 2.5 || 2.4 || 1.5 || .4 || 16.0
|-
|style="text-align:left;"|
|style="text-align:left;"|Charlotte
| 76 || 14 || 19.9 || .471 || .372 || .842 || 2.6 || 2.2 || 1.0 || .3 || 10.6
|-
|style="text-align:left;"|
|style="text-align:left;"|Charlotte
| 77 || 0 || 26.2 || .486 || .404 || .836 || 3.4 || 2.3 || 1.2 || .3 || 15.7
|-
|style="text-align:left;"|
|style="text-align:left;"|Charlotte
| 80 || 0 || 26.2 || .452 || .401 || .866 || 3.6 || 2.3 || 1.1 || .3 || 15.3
|-
|style="text-align:left;"|
|style="text-align:left;"|Charlotte
| 82 || 0 || 26.5 || .455 || .402 || .873 || 3.2 || 2.7 || 1.2 || .3 || 16.3
|-
|style="text-align:left;"|
|style="text-align:left;"|Charlotte
| 69 || 0 || 24.9 || .441 || .427 || .856 || 3.4 || 1.6 || .8 || .3 || 13.6
|-
|style="text-align:left;"|
|style="text-align:left;"|Charlotte
| 82|| 29 || 28.9 || .453 || .404 || .854 || 3.2 || 2.1 || 1.3 || .3 || 14.5
|-
|style="text-align:left;"|
|style="text-align:left;"|Charlotte
| 68 || 20 || 30.6 || .459 || .426 || .803 || 3.1 || 1.7 || .9 || .2 || 14.8
|-
|style="text-align:left;"|
|style="text-align:left;"|Charlotte
| 52 || 1 || 18.7 || .447 || .421 || .788 || 1.9 || 1.3 || .6 || .1 || 9.4
|-
|style="text-align:left;"|
|style="text-align:left;"|Milwaukee
| 42 || 0 || 20.6 || .485 || .476 || .824 || 2.0 || 1.1 || .9 || .1 || 10.1
|-
|style="text-align:left;"| 
|style="text-align:left;"| Toronto
| 67 || 9 || 16.3 || .427 || .393 || .750 || 1.5 || 1.3 || .5 || .1 || 7.6
|-
|style="text-align:left;"|
|style="text-align:left;"| Toronto
| 71 || 1 || 13.5 || .424 || .428 || .843 || 1.2 || 1.1 || .4 || .1 || 6.0
|-
|style="text-align:left;"|
|style="text-align:left;"| Toronto
| 56 || 4 || 15.8 || .406 || .344 || .892 || 1.4 || 1.1 || .4 || .1 || 6.4
|- class="sortbottom"
| align="center" colspan=2| Career
| 1,083 || 99 || 21.7 || .457 || .402 || .843 || 2.4 || 1.8 || .9 || .2 || 11.7
|-

Playoffs

|-
|style="text-align:left;"|1987
|style="text-align:left;"|Utah
| 2 || 0 || 2.0 || .000 || .000 || — || .0 || .0 || .0 || .0 || 0.0
|-
|style="text-align:left;"|1988
|style="text-align:left;"|Cleveland
| 2 || 0 || 8.5 || .250 || .000 || — || .5 || 1.0 || .0 || .5 || 1.0
|-
|style="text-align:left;"|1993
|style="text-align:left;"|Charlotte
| 9 || 0 || 24.7 || .433 || .286 || .818 || 3.6 || 2.0 || 1.4 || .0 || 11.0
|-
|style="text-align:left;"|1995
|style="text-align:left;"|Charlotte
| 4 || 0 || 26.8 || .471 || .429 || .909 || 2.3 || 1.5 || .0 || .0 || 12.8
|-
|style="text-align:left;"|1997
|style="text-align:left;"|Charlotte
| 3 || 1 || 16.7 || .294 || .250 || 1.000 || .3 || 1.7 || 1.3 || .0 || 4.7
|-
|style="text-align:left;"|1998
|style="text-align:left;"|Charlotte
| 9 || 0 || 19.0 || .593 || .250 || .857 || 2.1 || 1.1 || .8 || .3 || 5.8
|-
| style="text-align:left;"| 1999
|style="text-align:left;"|Milwaukee
| 3 || 0 || 16.3 || .404 || .125 || 1.000 || 1.3 || .3 || 1.0 || .0 || 3.0
|-
| style="text-align:left;"| 2000
|style="text-align:left;"| Toronto
| 3 || 0 || 10.0 || .133 || .667 || .500 || .7 || .3 || .7 || .0 || 2.3
|-
| style="text-align:left;"| 2001
|style="text-align:left;"| Toronto
| 12 || 0 || 15.2 || .500 || .378 || .833 || 1.2 || .8 || .5 || .1 || 6.5
|-
|style="text-align:left;"| 2002
|style="text-align:left;"| Toronto
| 4 || 0 || 14.8 || .422 || .800 || 1.000 || 1.3 || 1.0 || 1.3 || .5 || 7.0
|- class="sortbottom"
| align="center" colspan=2| Career
| 51 || 1 || 17.5 || .400 || .350 || .870 || 1.7 || 1.1 || .8 || .1 || 6.7
|-

Post-playing career
In 2004, Curry was inducted into the Virginia Sports Hall of Fame.

On June 18, 2007, Curry was named an assistant coach of the NBA's Charlotte Bobcats, but he stepped down before the season began so that he could attend his sons' basketball games.

In 2009, Curry started working as a commentator, alongside longtime play-by-play announcer Steve Martin, for the Charlotte Bobcats (now Charlotte Hornets).

In 2016, Curry was the recipient of the Bobby Jones Award at the Athletes in Action All Star Breakfast, which is held each year at the NBA All Star Weekend.

Personal life
On June 21, 1991, Curry and Charlotte Hornets teammate Muggsy Bogues appeared in a Minor League Baseball game for the Gastonia Rangers of the South Atlantic League. George Shinn, as owner of both teams, arranged the publicity stunt. Curry allowed only one run and struck out four batters in a three inning start.

In 1995, Dell and his wife, Sonya ( Adams), founded the Christian Montessori School of Lake Norman, a preschool in Huntersville, North Carolina.

In 1998, Curry established a charitable foundation, the Dell Curry Foundation, which is a youth oriented program in Charlotte, North Carolina. The foundation runs five learning centers in Charlotte to provide educational training and drug abuse counseling.

Curry married his college sweetheart Sonya in 1988. They have three children, Stephen, Seth, and Sydel. Stephen is the starting point guard for the Golden State Warriors. While he has been with them, they have won four NBA championships alongside 2 NBA MVP Awards. Stephen is married to Ayesha Curry. Seth currently plays for the Brooklyn Nets. He is married to Callie Rivers, sister of current NBA player Austin Rivers and daughter of former NBA player and current NBA coach Doc Rivers. Curry's daughter Sydel played volleyball at Elon University and is married to NBA player Damion Lee. She was featured on Say Yes to the Dress in 2018.

On August 23, 2021, Curry and his wife, Sonya, announced that they were divorcing after 33 years of marriage. Their divorce was finalized the following November.

References

External links
 

 Virginia Tech Hall of Fame bio
 NBA.com profile 
 NBA.com player bio

1964 births
Living people
African-American basketball players
African-American Christians
All-American college men's basketball players
American expatriate basketball people in Canada
American men's basketball players
Basketball players from Charlotte, North Carolina
Basketball players from Virginia
Charlotte Bobcats announcers
Charlotte Hornets expansion draft picks
Charlotte Hornets players
Cleveland Cavaliers players
Curry family
Gastonia Rangers players
McDonald's High School All-Americans
Milwaukee Bucks players
Parade High School All-Americans (boys' basketball)
People from Grottoes, Virginia
People from Harrisonburg, Virginia
Shooting guards
Toronto Raptors players
Utah Jazz players
Utah Jazz draft picks
Virginia Tech Hokies baseball players
Virginia Tech Hokies men's basketball players